Marina Tabassum (born ) is a Bangladeshi architect. She is the principal architect of Marina Tabassum Architects. In 2016, she won the Aga Khan Award for Architecture for the design of Bait-ur-Rouf Mosque in Dhaka, Bangladesh.

In 2020, Tabassum was listed by Prospect as the third-greatest thinker for the COVID-19 era, with the magazine writing, “At the forefront of creating buildings in tune with their natural environments, this Bangladeshi architect is also embracing the design challenges posed by what we are collectively doing to the planet.”

Early life and education
Tabassum was born in Dhaka, Bangladesh, the daughter of an oncologist. Her family migrated to Dhaka, Bangladesh from India during the partition of Bengal in 1947. She attended Holy Cross Girls School and College.
Tabassum graduated in architecture from Bangladesh University of Engineering and Technology in 1994.

Career
In 1995 Tabassum founded URBANA, an architecture practice based in Dhaka, Bangladesh with Kashef Chowdhury. The firm designed a number of projects for about ten years.

In 2005 Tabassum established her own practice, Marina Tabassum Architects, and she serves as its principal architect.

Since 2005 Tabassum has been a visiting professor at the BRAC University, where she has also taught courses on Contemporary South Asian Architecture. She also conducts undergraduate studios at the University of Asia Pacific, and has given lectures and presentations at a number of other educational institutions and conferences. She has been the Director of Academic Program at Bengal Institute for Architecture, Landscapes and Settlements since 2015. She also proposed the invitation of one of India's best architects Bijoy Jain to CAA 2013 in Bangladesh

Tabassum was the designer of Bait Ur Rouf Mosque in Dhaka, which was completed in 2012. In 2016 the project was shortlisted for the Aga Khan Award.

Notable Works

 1997-2006: Museum of Independence, Dhaka, Bangladesh
 2001: A5 Residence, Dhaka, Bangladesh
 2006-2011: Comfort Reverie, Dhaka, Bangladesh
 2009: Vacation House at Faridabad, Dhaka, Bangladesh
 2012: Baitur Rouf Mosque, Dhaka, Bangladesh
 2018: Panigram Eco Resort and Spa, Jashore, Bangladesh
 2020: Khudi Bari, Chars in the coastal areas of Bangladesh

Awards and honors

 First prize for the Independence Monument and the Liberation War Museum by the Bangladeshi Prime Minister Sheikh Hasina (1997)
 Architect of the Year Award, by the Indian Vice President Bhairon Singh Shekhawat (2001) 
 Anannya Top Ten Awards (2004)
 Finalist of Aga Khan Award for A5, a pavilion apartment (2004)
 Second runner-up of Nishorgo Architectural Competition (2006)
Aga Khan Award for Architecture (2016)
 Arnold W. Brunner Memorial Prize (2021)
 Soane Medal (2021)
 Lifetime Achievement Award (2022)

Exhibitions
 Marina Tabassum Architects: In Bangladesh (2023)

References

Living people
Bangladeshi women architects
Bangladesh University of Engineering and Technology alumni
Year of birth missing (living people)
Bangladeshi architects
21st-century Bangladeshi architects